Giorgi Meskhi (born 25 April 1998) is a Georgian water polo player for VK Šabac and the Georgian national team.

He participated at the 2018 Men's European Water Polo Championship.

References

1998 births
Living people
Male water polo players from Georgia (country)